Eliot Wagner is an American writer who published several novels depicting Jewish family life in New York City.

Works 
Wagner’s first novel, Grand Concourse (1954), follows a large lower-class Jewish family in the Bronx. My America!, published in 1980, follows a Jewish family in Manhattan’s Lower East Side from World War I until 1950.

Novels 

 Grand Concourse (1954)
 Better Occasions (1974)
 My America! (1980)
 Princely Quest (1985)
 Nullity Decree (1991)

References 

Jewish American writers
20th-century American writers
Possibly living people